Marko Jovanovski (born 24 July 1988) is a Macedonian professional footballer who plays as a goalkeeper for Ferizaj.

Career
In his career Jovanovski has also played for teams such as Vardar, Teteks, Shkëndija, Pelister and Cypriot side Ethnikos Achna as well as North Macedonia youth national teams.

References

External links
 

1988 births
Living people
Footballers from Skopje
Association football goalkeepers
Macedonian footballers
North Macedonia under-21 international footballers
FK Vardar players
FK Teteks players
KF Shkëndija players
Ethnikos Achna FC players
FK Pelister players
Sepsi OSK Sfântu Gheorghe players
FK Makedonija Gjorče Petrov players
Macedonian First Football League players
Cypriot First Division players
Liga II players
Macedonian expatriate footballers
Macedonian expatriate sportspeople in Cyprus
Expatriate footballers in Cyprus
Macedonian expatriate sportspeople in Romania
Expatriate footballers in Romania